The China Motor Bus Company, Limited, often abbreviated as CMB, is a property developer in Hong Kong. Before its franchise lapsed in 1998, it was the first motor bus operator in Hong Kong, and was responsible for the introduction of double-decker buses to Hong Kong Island.

History

Ngan Shing-kwan and Wong Yiu Nam formed a business in 1923 to provide services on Kowloon Peninsula. Prior to that, Ngan had operated a rickshaw business also on Kowloon Peninsula. In 1933, the company received the exclusive bus franchise from the Government of Hong Kong to operate routes on Hong Kong Island.

After World War II, the network of CMB's routes expanded with exploding population on the island. New buses were purchased to increase ridership. In the mid-1970s, a livery of buff upper body and a blue lower body was adopted. CMB adopt the policy to improve its service during the 1970s, including introducing the first type of rear-engine bus (Daimler Fleetline) and reforming the route number system. In 1976 CMB earned over $20 million HK dollars, the highest in the company history.

With the opening of the MTR Island line in 1985, and CMB's reputation of outdated ethos and poor services over the years, ridership on CMB declined. On 29/30 November 1989, CMB employees started a massive strike, after broken negotiations on their pension funds. During the strike, all CMB services on the island were halted, to the extent that the government was forced to use police vehicles to facilitate commuting to and from the Southern District. After the incident, the relationship between CMB and the government worsened, leading to the government to adopt more directive policies in respect of CMB.

Meanwhile, competitors such as Citybus had successfully lured passengers from CMB's franchised routes to their own residential routes. The establishment of route 37R as a residential route by Citybus illustrates this fact. The service provided more comfortable seats, air-conditioned fleet, and a more direct route (via Aberdeen Tunnel) from Chi Fu Fa Yuen to Admiralty. Citybus was able to compete against CMB by charging only the fare of non-air-conditioned, uncomfortable and indirect CMB counterparts like routes 40 and 37 (which took Pok Fu Lam Road as well as Bonham Road and Caine Road or Sai Ying Pun and Central respectively, instead). The residential route was later converted into a franchise route, 37M, that still continued to be operated by Citybus.

In 1993, the government redistributed 26 routes to Citybus, citing poor service levels. In 1995, a further 14 were transferred.

In February 1998, the government announced the franchise for all 140 routes operated by China Motor Bus would not be reviewed when it expired on 31 August 1998. Eighty-eight of the routes were placed to open tender, 12 routes were transferred directly to Citybus, one cross-harbour route to Kowloon Motor Bus, and the remaining routes were cancelled.

NWFB won the tender and commenced operations with around 50 new buses and 710 former CMB buses.

Current status
Since losing its franchise, its main business focus shifted to real estate, by developing former bus depot properties which it owned. There was a free shuttle bus service operated by the company between Island Place (one of the CMB's real estate developments) near the North Point MTR station and North Point Government Offices with a Volvo B6LE, acquired from Citybus, along with eight Marshall C37 bodied Dennis Darts. However, this service ceased on 30 June 2015 as the new environmental protection ordinance began to phase out pre Euro IV diesel commercial vehicles.

China Motor Bus has also purchased some properties in London.

Fleet
Besides the eight Dennis Dart Coach Express retained to operate the free shuttle service, most of the fleet was transferred to New World First Bus in 1998 after the end of CMB's franchise. Two Volvo Olympian air-conditioned buses were retained, being sold to Citybus in 2001 with a Volvo B6LE acquired in return.

Some of the buses transferred to New World First Bus were later sold to City Sightseeing in Australia and The Original Tour in London.

Historic
Partial list of historic bus types operated by CMB:

 Leyland Olympian
 Leyland Atlantean
 Leyland Victory Mark 2 Series 2
 Dennis Condor
 Daimler/Leyland Fleetline - either new or ex London Transport DM/DMS-class
 MCW Metrobus
 Guy Arab IV and V
 Leyland Titan PD3/4 and PD3/5

Depots
Chai Wan Depot: 391 Chai Wan Road/Sheung On Street (a 5-storey concrete parking facility, former head office of CMB and major depot since the 1990s)
Wong Chuk Hang Depot: Ocean Park Road (owned by the Government of Hong Kong) now used by NWFB
(Former) North Point Depot: site redeveloped by CMB as the residential complex  (construction started in March 1994, completed in May 1997)
Kennedy Town Depot: a minor depot later used by NWFB, now closed

References

External links

CMB official homepage on Internet Archive
 Non-franchise album of China Motor Bus (Chinese only)
 Timeline of China Motor Bus (Chinese only)
CMB Fleet
CMB Paperbus

Bus companies of Hong Kong
Companies listed on the Hong Kong Stock Exchange
Land developers of Hong Kong
1933 establishments in Hong Kong